"Rats" is a song written by Dave Davies and performed by The Kinks on their album Lola versus Powerman and the Moneygoround, Part One. It is the tenth song on the album, and has a duration of 2:40.  John Dalton's bass work is a notable aspect of the song.

Overview 
"Rats" is one of two songs by Davies on Lola vs Powerman, the other being "Strangers". It contrasts heavily with some of the other tracks on the album, featuring heavy guitar chords and fast-paced vocals. "Rats" marks an end somewhat to Dave Davies' contributions to Kinks albums, as ones preceding Lola versus Powerman and beginning with Kinda Kinks usually included one or two songs credited to Davies.

Single release 
It was released as a B-Side to "Apeman", which turned out to be a successful single in the UK, peaking at #5. While not as successful as its sister single Lola in the U.S., it did chart in the top 50 (see positions below).

Peak chart positions
5 United Kingdom
9 Australia
19 Canada
45 United States

External links 
Single Info
"Rats" Info
Chart Positions
Dave Davies Official Website

1970 singles
The Kinks songs
Songs written by Dave Davies
Song recordings produced by Ray Davies